The women's shot put at the 1954 European Athletics Championships was held in Bern, Switzerland, at Stadion Neufeld on 26 August 1954.

Medalists

Results

Final
26 August

Participation
According to an unofficial count, 16 athletes from 9 countries participated in the event.

 (3)
 (2)
 (2)
 (1)
 (1)
 (3)
 (1)
 (2)
 (1)

References

Shot put
Shot put at the European Athletics Championships
Euro